The BaliPure Purest Water Defenders are a professional volleyball club sponsored by Balibago Waterworks System, Inc. playing in the Premier Volleyball League (formerly, Shakey's V-League). The team debuted in the league's 13th Season Open Conference.

Current roster 
For the 2022 Premier Volleyball League Open Conference:

Coaching staff
 Head coach:Rommel Abella
 Assistant coach:Clarence Esteban

Team Staff
 Team Manager:
 Team Trainer:

Medical Staff
 Team Physician:
 Physical Therapist:

Previous roster 

For the 2021 Premier Volleyball League Open Conference:

Coaching staff
 Head coach:Rommel Abella
 Assistant coach:Clarence Esteban

Team Staff
 Team Manager:
 Team Trainer:

Medical Staff
 Team Physician:
 Physical Therapist:

For the 2019 Premier Volleyball League Open Conference:

Coaching staff
 Head coach:Rommel Abella
 Assistant coach:Clarence Esteban

Team Staff
 Team Manager:
 Team Trainer:

Medical Staff
 Team Physician:
 Physical Therapist:

Coaching staff
 Head coach: Rommel Abella
 Asst Coach: Clarence Esteban

Team Staff
 Team Manager:
 Team Trainer:

Medical Staff
 Team Physician:
 Physical Therapist:

Coaching staff
 Head coach: Raymund "Babes" Castillo
 Asst Coach: Regine Diego

Team Staff
 Team Manager: Paolo Turno
 Team Trainer: Franz Damian

Medical Staff
 Team Physician:
 Physical Therapist: Rafael Magno

For the Premier Volleyball League 1st Season Open Conference:

Coaching staff
 Head coach: Roger Gorayeb
 Asst Coach: Nonoy Are

Team Staff
 Team Manager: Paolo Turno
 Team Trainer:

Medical Staff
 Team Physician:
 Physical Therapist: Raymond Pili

For the Premier Volleyball League 1st Season Reinforced Open Conference:

Coaching staff
 Head coach: Roger Gorayeb
 Asst Coach: Nonoy Are

For the Shakey's V-League 13th Season Reinforced Open Conference

Coaching staff
 Head coach: Anusorn "Tai" Bundit
 Asst Coach: Leo Toyco

For the Shakey's V-League 13th Season Open Conference:

Coaching staff
 Head coach: Charo Soriano
 Asst Coach: Alexa Micek

Honors 
Team:

Individual:

Imports

Team captains 
  Alyssa Valdez (2016)
  Kaylee Manns (2016)
  Grethcel Soltones (2017)
  Jasmine Nabor (2017)
  Joyme Cagande (2018)
  Grazielle Bombita (2019)
  Alina Bicar (2021 - 2022)

Head coaches 
  Charo Soriano (2016, playing head coach)
  Anusorn "Tai" Bundit (2016)
  Roger Gorayeb (2017)
  Raymund Castillo (2018)
  Rommel Abella (2019)

Former players 

Local players

 Maria Rosario Soriano
 Grethcel Soltones
 Mary Mae Tajima
 Angeline Marie Gervacio
 Janine Marciano
 Alyssa Eroa
 Ivanah Agbayani
 Jamenea Ferrer
 Dennise Michelle Lazaro
 Jorella Marie de Jesus
 Karla Bello
 Ryssabel Devanadera
 Suzanne Roces
 Maria Beatriz Dominique Tan
 Alyssa Valdez
 Iris Oliveros
 Risa Sato
 Lizlee Ann Gata-Pantone
 Jasmine Nabor
 Ma. Asuncion Mendiola
 Abigail Noval
 Maria Angelica Cayuna

Foreign players

 Danijela Dzakovic

 Amy Ahomiro

 Alexandra Vajdovä

 Jaroensri Bualee

 Kaylee Manns
 Kate Morell
 Jennifer Keddy
 Janisa Johnson
 Alexis Matthews

References 

Shakey's V-League
2016 establishments in the Philippines
Volleyball clubs established in 2016
Women's volleyball teams in the Philippines